Heteromeryx is an extinct genus of artiodactyl, of the family Protoceratidae, endemic to North America. They resembled deer, but were more closely related to camelids.

Fossil distribution
Fossils have been recovered from: 
Big Red Horizon Site, Presidio County, Texas
Dirty Creek Ridge Site, Sioux County, Nebraska
French Creek Site, Custer County, South Dakota

References 

Protoceratids
Priabonian genus extinctions
Eocene even-toed ungulates
Eocene mammals of North America
Fossil taxa described in 1905
Prehistoric even-toed ungulate genera